This is a list of serious injuries and deaths in which one or more subjects of a selfie were killed or injured before, during, or after taking a photo of themselves, with the accident at least in part attributed to taking the photo.

Overview 
The United States Department of Transportation estimated that in 2014, the so-called "year of the selfie", 33,000 people were injured while driving and using a cell-phone in some fashion, which can include talking, listening, and "manual button/control actuation". A 2015 survey by Erie Insurance Group found that 4% of all drivers admitted to taking selfies while driving.

The Washington Post reported in January 2016 that "about half" of at least 27 "selfie related" deaths in 2015 had occurred in India. There is no official data on the number of people who died taking selfies in India, but reports show from 2014 to August 2016 that there have been at least 54 deaths in India while taking selfies. The Indian Ministry of Tourism asked states to identify and barricade "selfie danger" areas, its first national attempt to deal with the selfie deaths. Mumbai Police identified at least 16 danger zones after a man drowned attempting to save a selfie-taker. No-selfie zones were also established in certain areas of the Kumbh Mela because organizers feared that bottlenecks caused by selfie-takers could spark stampedes.

A 2018 study of news reports showed that there were 259 selfie deaths in 137 incidents reported globally between October 2011 and November 2017, with the highest occurrences in India, followed by Russia, United States, and Pakistan. The mean age was 23 years old, with male deaths outnumbering female about three to one.

From January 2008 to July 2021 there were 379 people who died in selfie related accidents.

Injuries and deaths

See also 

Death by GPS
List of graffiti and street art injuries and deaths
Mobile phones and driving safety
Rooftopping
Selfie
Texting while driving

References

Further reading
 
 
 
 
 
 
 

Accidents
Death-related lists
Health-related lists
Lists of people by cause of death
Portrait photography